Sosicles may refer to:

Sosicles (sculptor), 2nd-century Roman sculptor
Sosicles (statesman), 6th-century BC Corinthian politician
Sosicles (poet), father of the 4th-century tragic poet Sosiphanes
A character in Plautus's play Menaechmi